The Jaipur city wall is the city wall encircling the old Jaipur city in Rajasthan state in India.

History 
It was built in 1727 when the city was founded by Maharaja Jai Singh II.

Features 

The wall is six meters high and three meters thick. There are seven gates in the wall. The gates are:

Chandpole
Surajpole
Ajmeri gate or Kishanpole
New gate or Nayapole
Sanganeri gate or Shivpole
Ghat gate or Rampole
Samrat gate
Zorawar Singh Gate or Dhruvpole
Gangapole  
Chaar Darwaza
Singh Dwar

References
Building Jaipur: the making of an Indian city By Vibhuti Sachdev, Giles Henry Rupert Tillotson
Jaipur Municipal Corporation
Rajasthan Patrika Date 7/9/2020

Jaipur
Gates in India
Infrastructure completed in 1727
Buildings and structures in Jaipur
Tourist attractions in Jaipur
History of Jaipur
J